Vanessa Andrea Zahorian (born 1978/1979) is an American retired ballet dancer. She was a principal dancer at the San Francisco Ballet. She is currently one of the artistic directors of Pennsylvania Ballet Academy.

Early life
Zahorian was born in Allentown, Pennsylvania and is of Czech heritage. She started training at the Central Pennsylvania Youth Ballet at age 5. When she was 11, she was offered a scholarship to Vaganova Academy of Russian Ballet, but did not actually train there due to her young age and the political climate. At age 13, Zahorian started training at Kirov Academy of Ballet in Washington D.C.. She was then sponsored by the Prince of Monaco to be an apprentice in Kirov Ballet in St. Petersburg.

Career
Zahorian joined the San Francisco Ballet as a member of the corps de ballet in 1997, was named soloist two years later and promoted to principal dancer in 2002. Her first principal role is Odette-Odile in Swan Lake. She has since danced classical roles such as Sugar Plum Fairy in The Nutcracker, the title role in Giselle,  Kitri in Don Quixote and Tatiana in Onegin.

In 2017, Zahorian retired from the San Francisco Ballet after dancing Swan Lake, along with her husband, Davit Karapetyan. The couple now direct the Pennsylvania Ballet Academy together. She is also a Balanchine répétiteur.

Personal life
In 2010, Davit Karapetyan, a fellow San Francisco Ballet principal dancer proposed to Zahorian on stage after a performance of Romeo and Juliet. They married the following year. Zahorian graduated from the St. Mary's College of California.

Selected repertoire
Zahorian's repertoire with the San Francisco Ballet includes:

References

San Francisco Ballet principal dancers
American ballerinas
Living people
1970s births
21st-century American ballet dancers
Sportspeople from Allentown, Pennsylvania
American people of Czech descent
Prima ballerinas
Dancers from Pennsylvania
Saint Mary's College of California alumni
21st-century American women